Below is an incomplete list of diplomats from Great Britain to the Republic of Venice, specifically Heads of Missions until the abolition of the republic in 1797. It includes envoys from the Kingdom of England before the Union with Scotland of 1707.

Heads of Missions

English Ministers Resident
1604-1610: Henry Wotton 
1612-1615: Viscount Dorchester
1616-1619: Henry Wotton 
1620     :  Vacant 
1621-1623: Henry Wotton 
1634-1639: Earl of Denbigh
1639-1645: Sir Gilbert Talbot
1669-1672: Thomas Belasyse
1682–1685: Thomas Hobson
1689–1712: G. Broughton a resident diplomat
1697–1698: Charles Montagu, 4th Earl of Manchester Ambassador
1702: Sir Lambert Blackwell Envoy Extraordinary

Ministers Resident of Great Britain
1707–1708: Charles Montagu, 4th Earl of Manchester Ambassador
1708–1714: Christian Cole Secretary
1713: Charles Mordaunt, 3rd Earl of Peterborough Ambassador
1715: Christian Cole Resident
1715–1719: Alexander Cunningham Resident
1719–1722 and 1727–1736: Colonel Elizeus Burges Resident
1736–1744: No diplomatic relations due to "extraordinary distinctions and honours to the Pretender's son"
1744–1746: Robert Darcy, 4th Earl of Holderness
1746–1753: Sir James Gray Resident
1752–1754: Unknown: possibly Consul Smith as resident
1754–1765: John Murray
1762–1763: Charles Compton, 7th Earl of Northampton Ambassador
1765–1773: Sir James Wright, 1st Baronet, of Venice Resident
1769–1771: Robert Richie in charge in Wright's absence (also in 1775)
1773–1789: John Strange Resident (absent from 1786)
1786–1790: Robert Richie in charge
1789–1791: Sir Francis Vincent, Bt
1791–1793: William Lindsay
1793: Francis Drake
1793–1797: Sir Richard Worsley, Bt

In 1797, the Republic of Venice was abolished and divided by the Treaty of Campo Formio

References

Sources
 

 

Venice
 
British diplomats